Episkopi is a village lying partly in the Limassol district of Cyprus and partly in the British Overseas Territory of Akrotiri and Dhekelia. Episkopi is built on the hill of ancient Kourion, close to the western bank of the Kouris River.

In the medieval Kingdom of Cyprus, Episkopi was granted in fief to the House of Ibelin. It was in the hands of Federico Cornaro of the Republic of Venice from 1367 and granted to him in 1374 by the indebted king. It was known as La Piscopia da Cornaro, and the branch of the Cornaro family descended from Federico became known as Cornaro Piscopia. The Cornaros ran a large sugar plantation in their fief near Episkopi that employed slaves of Syrian or Arab origin or local serfs.

Twin towns – sister cities
Episkopi is twinned with:

 Argos, Greece

References

External links
 Photos Episkopi

Communities in Limassol District
History of sugar